Daniela Farinacci (also credited as Daniella Farinaci) is an Australian actress of Italian descent, who has many television, film and theatre credits.

Farinacci is perhaps best known for her role in the Australian movie Lantana as Paula, alongside Vince Colosimo. She also appeared in supporting roles in Little Fish and Look Both Ways.

Farinacci is known for a starring role in the 2006 television mini-series The Society Murders as Maritza Wales, based on a real-life crime. She also has a starring role in the police television drama series, East West 101 as Helen Callas.

Her theatre roles include Juliet in Romeo & Juliet and Helena in A Midsummer Night’s Dream and many more Melbourne theatre productions.

Filmography

Film

Television

References

External links

Australian film actresses
Australian television actresses
Australian people of Italian descent
Living people
Year of birth missing (living people)
21st-century Australian actresses